William Watson, Baron Thankerton, PC (8 December 1873 – 13 June 1948), was a Scottish Unionist Party politician and judge.

Life
Born in Edinburgh, Watson was the third son of Margaret Bannatyne (1846–1898) and William Watson, Baron Watson (1827–1899). He was educated at Winchester College and Jesus College, Cambridge, graduating with a Third in Law in 1895. In 1899, he was admitted to the Faculty of Advocates, taking silk in 1914. He was Procurator to the General Assembly of the Church of Scotland from 1918 to 1922, and was an advocate depute in 1919.

Watson was the Member of Parliament for Lanark South from 1913 to 1918 and for Carlisle from 1924 to 1929. He held office as Solicitor General for Scotland from July 1922 to November 1922, and as Lord Advocate from November 1922 to February 1924 and from November 1924 to May 1929. He was appointed a Privy Counsellor in 1922. He was raised to the bench as a Lord of Appeal in Ordinary and created a life peer as Baron Thankerton, of Thankerton in the County of Lanark, on 1 May 1929, holding the post until his death at 74 in 1948.
 
Lord Thankerton's hobby was knitting, and he would practise this while hearing cases.

References

Sources 

Concise Dictionary of National Biography

External links 
 

1873 births
1948 deaths
20th-century Scottish judges
Solicitors General for Scotland
Unionist Party (Scotland) MPs
Members of the Parliament of the United Kingdom for Scottish constituencies
Conservative Party (UK) MPs for English constituencies
Members of the Privy Council of the United Kingdom
Thankerton
UK MPs 1910–1918
UK MPs 1924–1929
UK MPs who were granted peerages
Sons of life peers
Members of the Judicial Committee of the Privy Council
Alumni of Jesus College, Cambridge
People educated at Winchester College
Members of the Faculty of Advocates
Lord Advocates
Scottish King's Counsel
20th-century King's Counsel
Barons created by George V
Watson